Ran Curiel (born 19 January 1949) is an Israeli diplomat.

Early life and education 

Curiel attended Tel Aviv University, where he studied Middle Eastern studies, African studies and archaeology. He received his Master's degree from the University of Haifa. 1990-92, Curiel studied European studies at the Hebrew University of Jerusalem and the Johns Hopkins University.

Diplomatic career 
In 1975, Curiel joined the Israeli Ministry of Foreign Affairs at the Israeli Embassy in Buenos Aires, serving as First Secretary from 1976 to 1981. Between 1981 and 85, he worked in the Department of Western European Affairs in Jerusalem. Between 1985 and 1989, he served as counsellor at Israeli embassy in Washington, D.C. before returning to Jerusalem. In 1996, Curiel became the Israeli Ambassador to Greece, a position he held until 2001. Between 2007 and 2011, Curiel was Deputy Director General at the Israeli Ministry of Foreign Affairs and head of the Western European Department. Curiel served as Israeli Ambassador to the European Union and NATO from 2007 to 2011.

He is the father of designer Noa Curiel.

References 

1949 births
Living people
20th-century Israeli civil servants
21st-century Israeli civil servants
Ambassadors of Israel to Greece
Ambassadors of Israel to the European Union
Israeli diplomats
Israeli Jews
Hebrew University of Jerusalem alumni
Johns Hopkins University alumni
Tel Aviv University alumni
University of Haifa alumni